Yusa is a Cuban singer and songwriter, born in the Buena Vista district of Havana, Cuba. Her music is recognised worldwide : in 2003, she was nominated at the prestigious BBC Radio 3 World Music Awards in two categories (Best Newcomer and Best of the Americas.)

Biography

Early life and education
Born in the Buena Vista district and brought up in the modern Alamar’s housing community of east Havana, Yusa’s childhood was cradled by music. She started studying guitar at the age of 6, at the Alejandro García Caturla elementary school. Then, attending the Amadeo Roldán Music Conservatory, she chose to concentrate on a particular type of Cuban guitar called the tres and started performing in Havana’s bars and clubs.

Career
Yusa is a multi-instrumentalist who is perfectly at ease playing guitar, bass, as well as keyboard or percussion instruments. Her music is defined as a young and thoroughly modern musical style echoing with funk, jazz, rap, and soul, but keeping its connections to its deep African and Caribbean heritage. Yusa is often considered by the field of music as a poet, singing bittersweet songs, and compared with great singers as Tracy Chapman.

Her songs are very influenced by the life in Havana and by traditional Cuban music, even though she modernizes it, taking the true substance and arranging it, following the contemporary trends of the new Cuban wave.

Discography
Yusa (Tumi Music, 2002)
Breathe (Tumi Music, 2005)
Haiku (Tumi Music, 2008)

Awards
2003: Cubadisco, Fusion category, Yusa

References

External links
BBC - Music - Yusa
Planète Aurora - Artists - Yusa

Year of birth missing (living people)
Living people
Cuban musicians
Multi-instrumentalists